Isomultiflorenol synthase (LcIMS1, (S)-2,3-epoxysqualene mutase (cyclizing, isomultiflorenol-forming)) is an enzyme with systematic name (3S)-2,3-epoxy-2,3-dihydrosqualenee mutase (cyclizing, isomultiflorenol-forming). It catalyses the chemical reaction:

 (3S)-2,3-epoxy-2,3-dihydrosqualene  isomultiflorenol

References

External links 
 

EC 5.4.99